The 1999 German Formula Three Championship was a multi-event motor racing championship for single-seat open wheel formula racing cars that held across Europe. The championship featured drivers competing in two-litre Formula Three racing cars built by Dallara and Martini which conform to the technical regulations, or formula, for the championship. It commenced on 9 May at Sachsenring and ended at Nürburgring on 17 October after nine double-header rounds.

Opel Team BSR driver Christijan Albers became a champion. He clinched the title, winning six of 18 races. Marcel Fässler finished as runner-up with wins at Sachsenring, Oschersleben, and Hockenheim, losing 45 points to Albers. Thomas Jäger was victorious at Zweibrücken, Oschersleben and finished third. The other race winners was Robert Lechner, Yves Olivier and Timo Scheider, who completed the top six in the drivers' championship.

Teams and drivers

Calendar
With the exception of round at Salzuburg in Austria, all rounds took place on German soil.

Results

Championship standings

Championship

Junior-Pokal (Rookie) standings

References

External links
 

German Formula Three Championship seasons
Formula Three season
German Formula 3